Burnpur Cement Limited is one of the largest producers of cement in Eastern India. The company has a plant in Asansol, West Bengal, which is functioning since 1991. It has a capacity of 1,000 TPD. The Patratu unit of Burnpur Cement Limited has a production capacity of 800 tonnes-per-day (TPD) cement.

Patratu Plant
The company has invested about Rs 300 crore for the plant. The state government had signed a Memorandum of Understanding with Burnpur Cement Limited way back in 2006. However, land acquisition and statutory clearances delayed the project. Chief Minister of Jharkhand, Raghubar Das inaugurated the plant on 13 July 2015.

References

External links

 

Cement companies of India
Manufacturing companies based in Kolkata
Manufacturing companies established in 1986
1986 establishments in West Bengal
Indian companies established in 1986
Companies listed on the National Stock Exchange of India
Companies listed on the Bombay Stock Exchange